Dave Bradley (February 13, 1947 – October 1, 2010) was an American football guard in the National Football League (NFL).

Biography
Bradley was born David Earl Bradley on February 13, 1947, in Burnham, Pennsylvania. He died on October 1, 2010.

Career

He played at college level at Pennsylvania State University, where he played both guard and tackle. He was chosen as a tackle for the North squad for the 1969 Senior Bowl post-season game.  The Nittany Anthology website named Bradley to its All-Penn State 1960s decade team as a guard.

Bradley was drafted by the Green Bay Packers in the second round of the 1969 NFL Draft and played his first three seasons with the team. During his final season in the NFL, he was a member of the St. Louis Cardinals. He also played for the Chicago Fire of the World Football League in 1974.  He wore number 61 for the Packers, 55 for the Cardinals and 64 for the Fire.

See also
List of Green Bay Packers players

References

People from Mifflin County, Pennsylvania
Green Bay Packers players
St. Louis Cardinals (football) players
American football offensive guards
Penn State Nittany Lions football players
1947 births
2010 deaths
Players of American football from Pennsylvania